Aligned Assets are a UK-based company from Surrey that develops address management, gazetteer software and Augmented Reality solutions for local authorities, the emergency services and the commercial sector.  They almost exclusively work with the AddressBase products from the Ordnance Survey.

History

Aligned Assets were formed in 1996 by Carl Nunn, later joined by Phil Gee in 1997 and Mike Saunt in 1998, who all met whilst working together for MapInfo Corporation (now Pitney Bowes MapInfo).  Originally working as MapInfo resellers and Geographical Information System (GIS) developers, the company saw early success by securing contracts with companies such as the BBC, Experian and Orange (brand).

Aligned Assets moved into address management with the development in 1997 of the BS7666 Toolbox that was built on behalf of MapInfo to assist UK Local Authorities in the development of the National Land and Property Gazetteer (NLPG).

They currently specialize in the gazetteer and address management market working both in the local government sector and with the emergency services.   They are the chosen supplier to the British Transport Police, Transport for London, Birmingham City Council and were involved in the FiReControl project.

After the introduction of BS7666:2006, they were the first company to achieve accreditation to the new standard  and the first company to have one of their customers fully migrated.

The start of 2010 saw the company move into the commercial sector after they became the UK's first reseller of NLPG data.  In 2011, they were announced as the first UK company to be able to provide products compatible with the NLPG's replacement - AddressBase.
In February 2017 Andy Hird and Dinesh Thanigasalam were announced as the new majority shareholders of Aligned Assets following a successful Management Buyout.

Operations

Aligned Assets provide Addressing software and consultancy to various market sectors across the UK. The services provided typically focus around Address Management solutions to the following markets:
 Local government
 The Emergency services
 Utilities
 Telecommunications
 Insurance

Some projects undertaken by Aligned Assets include:

 Network Fire Services Partnership  - Aligned Assets and 118 Information help NFSP Fire & Rescue Services in the South West improve their service
 West Yorkshire Police - Accurate Addressing in Connected Systems at West Yorkshire Police 
 British Transport Police - The Truth and Nothing But the Truth in Addressing at British Transport Police
 South Wales and Gwent Police Forces – Shared Service Gazetteer
 Barnsley Metropolitan Borough Council – Business Rates Retention
 Cambridgeshire Fire and Rescue Service – Corporate Gazetteer System
 London Borough of Harrow – Business Address Validation
 Christchurch and East Dorset Borough Councils – Shared Service Gazetteer Management

References

External links
 Public Sector Executive - Aligned Assets and the British Transport Police

GIS companies
Data quality companies
Gazetteers
Software companies established in 1996
Technology companies established in 1996
Software companies of the United Kingdom